The D51/52 Beijing-Shenyang Through Train is Chinese railway running between the capital Beijing to Shenyang, capital of Liaoning express passenger trains by the Shenyang Railway Bureau, Shenyang passenger segment responsible for passenger transport task, Shenyang originating on the Beijing train. CRH5 Type Passenger trains running along the Jingha Railway, Panjin–Yingkou High-Speed Railway and Harbin–Dalian High-Speed Railway across Liaoning, Hebei, Tianjin, Beijing and other provinces and cities, the entire 699 km. Beijing railway station to Shenyang North railway station running 6 hours and 3 minutes, use trips for D51; Shenyang North railway station to Beijing railway station to run 6 hours and 1 minutes, use trips for D52.

See also 
K53/54 Beijing-Shenyang Through Train
Beijing-Shenyang Through Train
G217/218 Beijing-Shenyang Through Train
G219/220 Beijing-Shenyang Through Train

References 

Passenger rail transport in China
Rail transport in Beijing
Rail transport in Liaoning